Private Parts  may refer to:
Intimate parts, such as the human sex organs
 Private Parts (book), a 1993 autobiography by Howard Stern
 Private Parts (1997 film), a film based on Stern's book
 Private Parts: The Album, a soundtrack album from the film
 Private Parts (1972 film), a black comedy horror film by Paul Bartel
 Private Parts (album), a 2001 album by Lords of Acid